Westglow, also known as the Elliott Daingerfield House, is a historic home located near Blowing Rock, Watauga County, North Carolina.  It was built in 1917, and is a -story, rectangular, Colonial Revival style frame dwelling with a hipped roof. It has a two-story hip roof extension. The front facade features a monumental tetrastyle portico supported by columns with Ionic order capitals. Also on the property are the contributing artists studio and caretaker's cottage (1920s). It was the summer home and studio of artist Elliot Daingerfield (1859-1932).

It was listed on the National Register of Historic Places in 1979.

References

Houses on the National Register of Historic Places in North Carolina
Colonial Revival architecture in North Carolina
Houses completed in 1917
Houses in Watauga County, North Carolina
National Register of Historic Places in Watauga County, North Carolina